Ratarda furvivestita is a moth in the family Cossidae. It is found in the Himalayas.

References

Ratardinae
Moths described in 1905